Samonte may refer to
Santo Antônio do Monte, a municipality in Brazil
Nadine Samonte (born 1988), Filipina actress and model
Nikki Samonte (born 2000), Filipina actress, singer and model
Samonte Cruz, Filipinx goldsmith and artist